Mun Ji-yun (문지윤, born 19 April 1971) is a South Korean judoka. She competed in the women's heavyweight event at the 1992 Summer Olympics.

She finished fifth at the 1989 World Judo Championships, won the 1991 World Judo Championships +72 kg class, and won a bronze medal at the 1993 World Judo Championships. On the continental level she won the silver medal at the 1988 Asian Judo Championships (as well as a bronze medal in the open class) and a bronze medal at the 1990 Asian Games.

References

1971 births
Living people
South Korean female judoka
Olympic judoka of South Korea
Judoka at the 1992 Summer Olympics
Place of birth missing (living people)
Judoka at the 1990 Asian Games
Judoka at the 1994 Asian Games
Asian Games medalists in judo
Asian Games silver medalists for South Korea
Asian Games bronze medalists for South Korea
Medalists at the 1990 Asian Games
Medalists at the 1994 Asian Games
20th-century South Korean women
21st-century South Korean women